Marion Koogler McNay (7 February 1883 – 13 April 1950), was an American painter,art collector, and art teacher who inherited a substantial oil fortune upon the death of her parents. She later willed her fortune to be used to establish San Antonio's first museum of modern art, which today bears her name. Inspired by Modern, Impressionism, and American Art she used her wealthy background to cultivate her eclectic art collection. McNay was able to design her San Antonio home after moving there in 1926. As soon as McNay moved to San Antonio she began buying and commissioning art pieces. The Spanish styled house was able to showcase a diverse amount of paintings including both American and European styled art. McNay favored Art made in the South Western American style. The fortune she inherited was able to fund her art collection which spanned over seven hundred art pieces by 1950, marking the year of her passing. San Antonio allowed McNay to have an expansive estate marking over 23 acres of land. The goal for McNay was to make her museum "a place of beauty with the comforts and warmth of a home."

Early life 
Marion was born in Ohio to Dr.Marion and Clara Koogler.  McNay was their only child and a year after her birth, the family moved to El Dorado, Kansas, where her parents invested and purchased a large tract of pasture land.This land later proved to contain substantial oil reserves, and made the family wealthy. This allowed Marion to attend the University of Kansas from 1900 to 1902 and the Art Institute of Chicago. When her parents retired in Marion, Ohio she made her move back to her home state.The San Antonio mansion she purchased in 1926 after McNay's inheritance was designed by Atlee and Robert Ayres on an acreage called Sunset Hills and was finished in 1929.

Marriages 
Marion married her first husband, railway manager and sergeant, Don McNay, in 1917. The marriage only lasted 10 months, ending with Don's death from the Spanish influenza in 1918. She first visited Texas when Don McNay was stationed in Laredo during World War I. In 1926, she moved to San Antonio, Texas where she then married prominent ophthalmologist Donald T. Atkinson who also owned a piece of land north of San Antonio, Texas known as Sunset Hills. Although Marion and Donald were both wealthy, her oil inheritance was not affected during the Great Depression. After her marriage with Donald ended in 1936, she went on to marry (and divorce) four more times, eventually reverted to using the name McNay for the remainder of her life. She briefly married and financially supported artist Victor Higgins in 1937, but the two separated only two years later and divorced in 1940.

Teaching 
In 1915, while she was living with her parents, the superintendent of city schools of Marion, Ohio wrote that she "is one of the best qualified art teachers I have ever known. She teaches art in a manner that arouses and develops the child's observation and enlarges his aesthetic nature." McNay supported the Arts and in 1942, she offered the use of her home to the San Antonio Art Institute which in turn prevented the school's closure. Her friend and collaborator, sculptor Charles Umlauf, said that she "always had the sympathy of the artist at hand because she herself was an artist. In the later part of McNay's career she dedicated her time to be a part of the directorship of the San Antonio Art Institute, which eventually closed in 1990, forty years after her death.

Art collection 
In 1926, after the death of her father, Marion moved to San Antonio with her mother and married Dr. Donald Atkinson. On his property, she began to construct a Spanish Mediterranean style mansion (she designed some of the tilework and ceiling stencils herself), which was completed in 1927. She also began to accumulate a significant collection of artwork. The first oil painting she purchased was Diego Rivera's Delfina Flores. She collected a large number of French Impressionist and Post-Impressionist works of art, early 20th-century modernists including Picasso, Matisse, and Chagall. She also bought a number of Southwestern santos and retablos. Alongside these works photographs,Native American pottery,sculptures,prints and designs have been added both post-humorously and through her own purchases.

Pueblo Indian patronage 
Marion was a significant patron of the arts among the Pueblo Indians of New Mexico, where she made frequent trips. Although raised Presbyterian, McNay converted to Catholicism under the wisdom and teachings of Rev.Peter Baque, the founder of The Missionary Servants of St. Anthony.The organization was given money by McNay as a form of charity work In 1943, Congress proposed a bill providing for the exploration of Pueblo lands with the ultimate goal of building a dam on the Rio Grande. Marion, in conjunction with other conservationists, was instrumental in defeating this proposal. Later McNay requested to be buried next to Rev. Baque in San Antonio after his death in 1938.

Death and legacy  
Upon her death, Marion left her art collection of more than 700 works of art, along with the house, the surrounding 23 acres of land, and an endowment, to establish the first Art Museum of Modern Art in Texas. This was the first museum of its kind in San Antonio and the Southwest region of the United States.The museum was named in honor of Marion and has been considered the centerpiece of San Antonio art community and culture. The museum expanded to include galleries of medieval and Renaissance artwork and a larger collection of 20th-century European and American modernist work. A large theatre arts library and gallery were also added, as well as an art reference library and an auditorium. More recently, the McNay Art Museum recently added the Stieren Center, built by internationally renowned architect Jean-Paul Viguier, to display their Modern collection.

References

External links
 The McNay Art Museum
 Marion Koogler McNay Art Institute records, 1955-1981 at the Smithsonian Archives of American Art

1883 births
1950 deaths
People from Logan County, Ohio
People from El Dorado, Kansas
University of Kansas alumni
School of the Art Institute of Chicago alumni
People from San Antonio
Painters from Texas
Painters from Ohio
Artists from Kansas
20th-century American painters
American art collectors
Women art collectors
American art educators